The International Spy Museum is an independent non-profit museum which documents the tradecraft, history, and contemporary role of espionage. It holds the largest collection of international espionage artifacts on public display. The museum opened in 2002 in the Penn Quarter neighborhood of Washington, D.C., and relocated to L'Enfant Plaza in 2019.

History
Milton Maltz, a code-breaker during the Korean War and founder of the Malrite Communications Group in 1956 (later The Malrite Company), conceptualized the International Spy Museum in 1996 as a for-profit organization. It opened to the public in 2002. 

The foundation cost of the original museum was half funded by the Malrite Company; the other $20 million came from the District of Columbia through enterprise zone bonds and TIF bonds. The museum was part of the ongoing rejuvenation of Penn Quarter, kicked off in the 1980s by the Pennsylvania Avenue Development Corporation.

In April 2015, plans were released for a new museum designed by Rogers Stirk Harbour + Partners. In January 2019, the museum began the process of moving from its previous F Street location to the new $162 million dedicated building at 700 L'Enfant Plaza, and it reopened to the public on May 12, 2019. The 32,000 square foot L'Enfant Plaza building has a 145-seat theater, rooftop terrace, and top-floor event space. The new museum is a non-profit enterprise.

Educational and cultural programs are offered for students, adults, and families including scholarly lectures, films, book signings, hands-on workshops, and group tour packages. The museum charges admission fees.

Permanent collection

The museum houses more than 7,000 artifacts with around 1,000 on public display, accompanied by historical photographs, interactive displays, film, and video. The permanent collection traces the complete history of espionage, from the Ancient Greeks and the Roman Empire, the Middle Ages, the Renaissance, the British Empire, the American Revolutionary War, the French Revolution, the Napoleonic Wars, the American Civil War, both World Wars, the Cold War, and through present day espionage activity. Exhibits include:

Briefing Center

Visitors receive an Undercover Mission badge and cover identity in the "Briefing Center". Here, visitors preview the museum's spy artifacts and watch a five-minute film introducing the shadow world of spying.

Stealing Secrets
In the "Stealing Secrets" gallery, visitors learn about spies and spymasters, gadget makers, scientists, and engineers from past and present. Hundreds of imaginative inventions used to steal secrets are displayed in this gallery.

Making Sense of Secrets
In the "Making Sense of Secrets" gallery, visitors learn how secret information gets turned into useful intelligence. The gallery's interactive exhibits inform how codes are made, analyzed, and broken.

Covert Action
In the "Covert Action" gallery, visitors discover the age-old techniques leaders use to secretly influence events abroad. They learn about covert mission failures and successes from sabotage to lethal action.

Spying That Shaped History
The "Spying that Shaped History" gallery illustrates the impact of intelligence on history. Visitors explore stories from the American Revolution to 21st century cyberwarfare and hear what intelligence officers think about on-screen spies.

An Uncertain World
The "An Uncertain World" gallery explores how spy agencies protect against threats at home. Visitors learn what can happen when they go too far and delve into spy tales from Renaissance Venice to Cold War Berlin.

Debriefing Center
Visitors receive the conclusion to their Undercover Mission in the Debriefing Center including a performance debrief that summarizes their top spy skills.

Previous exhibits
The museum had an interactive exhibit called Operation Spy where visitors assumed the roles of covert agents and participated in a one-hour Hollywood-style spy simulation. Visitors moved from area to area, interacting with puzzles, tasks, motion simulators, sound effects, and video messages to work through a mission to intercept a secret arms deal involving a nuclear trigger.

In 2011, the museum had an interactive called Spy in the City where visitors were given a GPS-type device and had to find clues near various landmarks in the area surrounding the museum to obtain the password for a secret weapon.

Notable Items in the Permanent Collection 

 A Four Rotor Japanese Enigma Machine, built by Germany during World War II for its ally, Japan.
 The wreckage of Francis Gary Powers' U-2 plane.
 A 1922 Silver Dollar with Suicide Pin that was made by the CIA for the U-2 program.
 A Bay of Pigs flag. The 2506 Assault Brigade was meant to fly this flag as a symbol of victory following the 1961 invasion attempt.
 A vial of heavy water produced to commemorate WWII's Operation Gunnerside.
 A printing plate used in Operation Bernhard, an exercise by Nazi Germany to forge British bank notes.
 A coat with a buttonhole camera, created by the KGB.
 A c.1949 Steineck ABC Wristwatch Camera from Germany. The watch allowed an agent to take photographs while pretending to check his or her watch.
 A Lipstick Pistol used by KGB operatives during the Cold War.
 A replica of an Aerial Surveillance Pigeon Camera from World War I.

In popular culture

Film
The museum is included in the bonus features of the 25th anniversary edition of Mission: Impossible (film).
The museum's Aston Martin DB5 car was used in the movie Goldfinger, the third part of the James Bond film series.

Television
SPY board members Robert Wallace and Keith Melton are co-executive producers of Netflix's 2021 Spycraft series. The museum's executive director, Chris Costa, is interviewed in the third episode of season 1 titled Sexspionage.
The museum has made many appearances on Mysteries at the Museum. 
In season 14, episode 10 of Law and Order titled Acceptable Loss, Nick Amaro mentions taking his daughter to the Spy Museum.
 The museum was referenced in season 4, episode 4 of Madam Secretary. Elizabeth McCord's son is doing a school report on the CIA, so Henry and Jason make plans to visit the Spy Museum.
 The museum was used as a setting in the season 3 episode of Fetch! with Ruff Ruffman entitled Mission Improbable. It was where Ruff sent the FETCHers to learn about how to become spies.
Ozzy and Jack Osbourne in the eighth episode of season 1 of Ozzy and Jack's World Detour, visit the museum.

Literature
In collaboration with National Geographic, the museum published the International Spy Museum's Handbook of Practical Spying. 
The children's books, Who's Hiding in the Spy Museum? and A Secret Message by Ellen Lewis are set in the museum.

Web
BBC's Reel, The Secrets of the Culper Spy Ring features scenes filmed at the museum and an interview with Jacqueline Eyl, the Spy Museum's director of youth education.
In collaboration with WIRED, the International Spy Museum's video, Former CIA Chief of Disguise Breaks Down Cold War Spy Gadgets featuring board member Jonna Mendez, was nominated for a 2021 Webby Award.     
Jennifer Lawrence while promoting her film Red Sparrow on The Late Show with Stephen Colbert, mentions that former intel officers would tell their children they were spies by showing them Spy Kids, then taking them to the Spy Museum.

Programming
Paramount held their Mission: Impossible – Fallout press event at the museum.  
George Lazenby who played James Bond in On Her Majesty's Secret Service (1969), attended the 2018 Global James Bond Day at the Spy Museum.  
Then-President of the United States, Barack Obama, visited the museum on July 30, 2010.

Podcast 

 The Spy Museum has a weekly podcast, SpyCast, hosted by the museum's historian and curator Dr. Andrew Hammond.

See also
CIA Museum
Imperial War Museum
National Cryptologic Museum

References

External links

 

Espionage museums
History museums in Washington, D.C.
Industry museums in Washington, D.C.
Military and war museums in Washington, D.C.
Museums established in 2002
2002 establishments in Washington, D.C.
Penn Quarter
Southwest Federal Center
Law enforcement museums in the United States